The Lake Bridenthal House is a historic house in Wymore, Nebraska. It was built in 1900 for Lake Bridenthal, a banker, merchant and farmer who died in 1942. It was designed in the Queen Anne architectural style, with a turret and a domed roof. It has been listed on the National Register of Historic Places since February 24, 1983.

References

National Register of Historic Places in Gage County, Nebraska
Queen Anne architecture in Nebraska
Houses completed in 1900